Flexivirga is a genus of bacteria from the family of Dermacoccaceae.

References

 

Micrococcales
Bacteria genera